The Albany Cardinals were a minor league baseball club, based in Albany, Georgia, that existed between 1935 and 1958. It was member of the Class D Georgia–Florida League and an affiliate with the St. Louis Cardinals, through most of their existence. The team began play in 1935 as the Albany Travelers from 1935 through 1938. The took up the Cardinals name in 1939 and won 4 of the league's titles.

References
 Baseball Reference – Albany, Georgia

Baseball teams established in 1935
Baseball teams disestablished in 1958
Defunct Georgia-Florida League teams
Professional baseball teams in Georgia (U.S. state)
St. Louis Cardinals minor league affiliates
1935 establishments in Georgia (U.S. state)
1958 disestablishments in Georgia (U.S. state)
Defunct baseball teams in Georgia